Yerofey Pavlovich is an urban locality (a work settlement) in Skovorodinsky District of Amur Oblast, Russia, located at the Trans-Baikal Railway. Population: 

It was named after the explorer Yerofey Pavlovich Khabarov.

References

Urban-type settlements in Amur Oblast